Mu Crucis, Latinized from μ Crucis, is the seventh-brightest star in the constellation Crux commonly known as the Southern Cross. μ Crucis is a wide double star of spectral class B stars, magnitude 4.0 and 5.2 respectively. They lie about 370 light-years away, and both stars are likely physically attached.  The brighter component is known as μ1 Crucis or μ Crucis A, while the fainter is μ2 Crucis or μ Crucis B.

μ1 Crucis is the brighter of the two stars with an apparent magnitude of 4.0.  It is a hot massive main sequence or subgiant star, over a thousand times as luminous as the sun.

μ2 Crucis is the fainter of the pair.  Its apparent magnitude is 5.2 and it is a Be star, a star spinning so quickly that it has ejected a disc of material that creates emission lines in its spectrum.  The disc is inclined at 36° to our line of sight.

References

Binary stars
Crucis, Mu
Crux (constellation)
B-type main-sequence stars
B-type subgiants
Lower Centaurus Crux
4898
112091 2
063003 5
Durchmusterung objects
Be stars